The Madhya Pradesh Police Department is the law enforcement agency for the state of Madhya Pradesh in India.

Organizational structure

Hierarchy
The Madhya Pradesh Police uses the following ranks:

Officers

 Director General of Police (DGP)
 Additional Director General of Police (ADGP)
 Inspector General of Police (IG)
 Deputy Inspector General of Police (DIG)
 Superintendent of Police (SP)
 Additional Superintendent of Police (Addi.SP)
  Deputy SP or CSP

Sub-ordinates

 Inspector of Police / Town Inspector (TI)
 Subedar 
 Sub-Inspector of Police (SI)
 Assistant Sub-Inspector of Police (ASI)
 Head Constable
 Constable

Organizational structure 
Madhya Pradesh Police is headed by Director General of Police. He is assisted by Additional Directors General of Police, who head various branches in Police Headquarters.

Initiatives 

Black Ribbon Initiative- on 26 November 2013 ADGP Mr. Varun Kapoor of PRTS Indore launched an awareness and public outreach program] to make all sections of society computer security aware and alert. This is designed to protect the citizens from becoming victims of cyber offences and at the same time to prevent them from become offenders under the various sections of the Information Technology Act, 2000, by mistake or due to lack of knowledge. In last five years they have conducted more than 300 workshops across India. This initiative was spearheaded by IPS Mr.Varun Kapoor.

Statistical data 
Madhya Pradesh Police department publish its statistical data every year.(See reference link below for PDF) (

References

External links
 Madhya Pradesh Police, Bhopal Madhya Pradesh

Government of Madhya Pradesh
State law enforcement agencies of India
Government agencies with year of establishment missing